The Battle for the Rag is the name given to the LSU–Tulane football rivalry. It is an American college football rivalry game played by the LSU Tigers football team of Louisiana State University and the Tulane Green Wave football team of Tulane University. The game was played nearly every year since its inception in 1893, with the last of ninety-eight games being played in 2009. Tulane and LSU spent much of their athletic histories as members of the same conference: the SIAA from 1899 to 1920, the Southern Conference from 1922 to 1932, and as charter members of the SEC from 1932 to 1966.

The "Rag"

The winner is awarded a satin trophy flag known as the Tiger Rag at LSU and the Victory Flag at Tulane. The flag is divided diagonally, with the logos of each school placed on opposite sides and the Seal of Louisiana in the center. LSU's name for the flag comes from the popular tune Tiger Rag, one of the songs performed by the Louisiana State University Tiger Marching Band.

The original flag was created in 1940 to foster good sportsmanship, most likely in response to growing tension between fans of the two teams that eventually escalated into a riot after Tulane's victory in 1938.  It is believed that this flag was destroyed in a 1982 fire at Tulane's University Center.  In 2001, LSU and Tulane worked together to create a reconstruction of the rag based upon archived photographs.

2006 series renewal
In 2006 the rivalry was officially renewed, returning to yearly play for the first time since 1994. The teams began play that year and continued until 2009, when it was announced that LSU would pay Tulane $700,000 to void the final six years of the home-and-home series. LSU held that it would benefit if the remaining games were all played in Baton Rouge. Not wanting to give up its home games, Tulane agreed to end the series early, though the teams did agree to play one future game in New Orleans, a game that LSU has thus far refused to actually play.

Game results

† LSU was declared the winner by forfeit in the 1896 and 1901 games.  The score for each game prior to a forfeit declaration was: 1896-Tulane 2, LSU 0, and 1901-Tulane 22, LSU 0. Official scores subsequent to the forfeitures are listed in the table.
# Rankings are from the AP Poll released prior to each game.

See also
 List of NCAA college football rivalry games

References

External links

College football rivalries in the United States
LSU Tigers football
Tulane Green Wave football
1893 establishments in Louisiana